Roxanne Charles-George is a mixed media artist, activist, curator, storyteller, and cultural historian of Strait Salish and European descent. She is a current councilor. and active band member of Semiahmoo First Nation in Surrey, British Columbia, where she promotes art, language, and culture. As an artist, she works with a wide range of media. She directly responds to the problems of colonialism, and documents issues that reflect her life experiences such as spirituality, identity, urbanization, food security, resource extraction, trauma, and various forms of systemic violence. As a contemporary storyteller and cultural historian, her goal is to touch, move, and inspire others through her work. Her work employs traditional Semiahma forms of knowledge such as visual representation, oral history, and ceremony.

Her work is in the collection of Surrey Art Gallery.

Exhibitions

Solo 

 The Strata of Many Truths, Museum of Vancouver, 2019.

Group 

 Ninety-Seven Days, Kwantlen Polytechnic University, 2014
 Views from the South Bank I: Histories, Memories, Myths, Surrey Art Gallery, 2015
 Gross Density Parcel, AgentC Projects, 2015
 Intangible: Memory and Innovation in Coast Salish Art, Bill Reid Gallery, 2017
 Ground Signals, Surrey Art Gallery, 2017
 how do you carry the land, Vancouver Art Gallery, 2018
 Connecting Threads, Surrey Art Gallery, 2018
 Li iyá:qtset – We Transform It, Reach Gallery Museum, 2019
 The Lind Prize 2019, Polygon Gallery, 2019

 In 2020, Charles-George began a collaboration with Laiwan and Daniel Negatu on a story-based artwork installation, in conjunction with the opening of Simon Fraser University's School of Sustainable Energy Engineering in Surrey.

Education 
Charles-George holds two undergraduate degrees from Kwantlen Polytechnic University, and completed a Master of Fine Arts at Simon Fraser University, Vancouver, BC. She also holds a certificate in Northwest Coast Jewelry Design from the Native Education College in Vancouver, BC.

Teaching 
Charles-George has taught arts workshops with Surrey Art Gallery, the White Rock Museum & Archives, and ArtsStarts.

Curating 
In 2017, Charles-George co-curated the exhibition Ground Signals at Surrey Art Gallery. In 2018, Charles-George was a guest curator for the Vancouver Mural Festival.

Publications 

 pensamientos en la Frontera, Moniker Press, 2018
 Northwest Coast #5 Roxanne Charles, Or Gallery, 2019

Community involvement 
Charles-George has been vocal and influential in addressing issues related to water quality and infrastructure, to the Semiahmoo First Nations. She has participated in organizing land-defense, and movement against fossil fuel expansion projects such as the Trans Mountain pipeline.

Awards 
Charles-George received a Paul Harris Fellow Award from the Semiahmoo Rotary Club in 2015. In 2018, she was recognized with a Surrey Civic Treasure award in 2018, which honours those “who have achieved excellence in the production of the arts and/or made significant contributions to the development of arts and heritage in the City of Surrey and beyond,” for her work as an artist and educator. In 2019, she was nominated for the Lind prize.

References 

21st-century Canadian artists
Coast Salish people
Year of birth missing (living people)
Living people
Kwantlen Polytechnic University alumni
Simon Fraser University alumni